Elizalde is a surname that originated in Spain and may refer to:

Persons 
Founders of Elizade & Company and Elizalde Holdings Corporation  
Fred Elizalde (1907–1979), Filipino musician and bandleader
Joaquín Miguel Elizalde (1896–1965), Filipino diplomat and businessman
Manolo Elizalde, Filipino businessman
Álvaro Elizalde (born 1969), Chilean politician and lawyer
Betty Elizalde (1940–2018), Argentine journalist and broadcaster
Edgar Elizalde (born 2000),  Uruguayan footballer
Emilio Elizalde (born 1950), Spanish physicist
Francisco Elizalde (born 1932), Filipino sports official
Jesús Elizalde Sainz de Robles (1907–1980), Spanish Carlist politician
Manuel Elizalde (1936–1997), Filipino entrepreneur
Mike Elizalde (born 1960), Mexican make-up artist
Valentín Elizalde (1979–2006), Mexican vocalist

Companies 
Elizalde (automobile), Spanish automobile manufacturer
Elizalde Holdings Corporation, owners of Manila Broadcasting Company

Basque-language surnames